Thomas J. McCormack (September 28, 1922 – August 18, 1998) was a member of the Pennsylvania State Senate, serving during 1978. He also served in the Pennsylvania House of Representatives.

References

Democratic Party Pennsylvania state senators
Democratic Party members of the Pennsylvania House of Representatives
1922 births
1998 deaths
20th-century American politicians